Glendon may refer to:

Places
Glendon (lost settlement), deserted village in Northamptonshire, England
Glendon, Alberta,  village in Alberta, Canada
Glendon, Pennsylvania,  borough in Northampton County, Pennsylvania, United States
Glendon, North Carolina, United States

People
George Glendon, English footballer
J. Frank Glendon (1886–1937), American film actor
Kevin Glendon (born 1961), English association footballer
Martin Glendon  (1877–1950), American baseball player
Mary Ann Glendon (born 1938), American scholar and diplomat
Pat Glendon (born 1894), Irish hurler 
William Glendon (c. 1920 – 2008), American attorney

Others
Glendon College, in  Toronto, Ontario, Canada